Presidential elections were held in the Comoros on 4 March 1990, with a second round on 11 March. The elections had originally been scheduled for January, but were postponed, resulting in demonstrations. Elections were held on 18 February, but were abandoned due to fraud allegations. 

Although Mohamed Taki Abdoulkarim of the opposition National Union for Democracy in the Comoros received the most votes in the first round, incumbent President Said Mohamed Djohar of the Comorian Union for Progress won with 55% of the vote in the second round. They were the first multi-party elections in the Comoros since independence. 

Voter turnout was 63.7% in the first round and 60.2% in the second.

Results

References

Presidential elections in the Comoros
President
Comoros
Comoros